Daguragu, previously also known as Wattie Creek by the Gurindji people as it is situated on a tributary of the Victoria River, is a locality in the Northern Territory of Australia. Daguragu community is situated on Aboriginal land held under perpetual title; it was also formerly a local government area until its amalgamation into the Victoria Daly Shire on 1 July 2008.

Being located on a floodplain, the settlement can be severely affected by flooding at times. In February 2001, two cyclones caused major flooding in the vicinity and the road between Kalkarindji and Daguragu was flooded, leaving the residents of Daguragu completely isolated for weeks. In 2023 major flooding occurred again, with hundreds of residents evacuated to Darwin and unable to return to their homes for some time.

Governance
As of 2006, Daguragu Community Government Council provided "municipal and other services to the township and surrounds of Kalkarindji (formerly known as Wave Hill Welfare Settlement) and to Daguragu, a community settled on land under the Aboriginal Land Rights Act 1976. Kalkaringi was within a gazetted township area, with the land being leasehold under the auspices of the Northern Territory Government.

Daguragu's boundaries and name were gazetted on 4 April 2007. It is named after the Aboriginal community located within its boundaries where in 1975, then Prime Minister Gough Whitlam presented the title to the land granted to the Gurindji people following the events of the Wave Hill walk-off in 1966.

Daguragu Community was amalgamated into the Victoria Daly Shire on 1 July 2008.  Daguragu is located within the federal division of Lingiari, the territory electoral division of Stuart and the local government area of the Victoria Daly Region.

2020 native title claim
A native title claim was lodged in 2016 by the Central Land Council on behalf of the traditional owners, as there were mining interests in area covered by Wave Hill Station's pastoral lease. Justice Richard White said that the determination recognised Indigenous involvement (Jamangku, Japuwuny, Parlakuna-Parkinykarni and Yilyilyimawu peoples) with the land "at least since European settlement and probably for millennia". The owners will participate in the mining negotiations and exploration work, from which royalties may flow in the future, which may allow people in the Kalkarindji and Daguragu communities to create their own businesses. They also have the right to hunt, gather, teach and perform cultural activities and ceremonies, and allow the young people to connect with their land.

Demographics
The 2016 Australian census reported that Daguragu had a population of 242 people, of whom 233 identified as Aboriginal and/or Torres Strait Islander.

Heritage sites
The Wave Hill walk-off route was listed on the Northern Territory Heritage Register on 23 August 2006  and on the Australian National Heritage List on 9 August 2007.  There are also seven other associated sites on the National Heritage List, of which five are in the Kalkaringi area and two within Daguragu.

Geography and flooding
The settlement was formerly also known as Wattie Creek by the  local Gurindji people. 

Wattie Creek is a major tributary of the Victoria River, and Daguragu lies on its floodplain. It can be prone to flooding when extreme weather events occur. In February 2001, ex-tropical cyclones Winsome and Wylva caused major flooding in the vicinity, and although properties in Daguragu were not indundated (as they were in Kalkarindji), the road between the two communities was flooded and the residents of Daguragu were completely isolated for weeks.

2023 flooding
In late February to early March 2023, heavy rains fell over the area, with Kalkarindji recording  of rain in the 24 hours to 1 March. Evacuations were ordered for residents of Daguragu, Kalkarindji, Pigeon Hole, and Palumpa. An emergency was declared for district. First, Daguaragu and Pigeon Hole were fully evacuated to Kalkarindji, whence two aeroplanes of the Australian Defence Force carried evacuees out of Kalkarindji to Katherine. They then travelled by bus to Darwin, to be accommodated at the Centre of National Resilience in Howard Springs. On 7 March it was reported that it could be a month or longer before residents of some communities would be able to return home, as many houses and infrastructure had been so severely damaged by the floodwaters. Around 700 people had been evacuated, while 80 to 100 dogs had been left behind. Contractors later delivered food to the dogs.

See also
 Kalkarindji

References

Further reading
 Article by the author of the 2017 book A Handful of Sand: The Gurindji Struggle, After the Walk-off.

Populated places in the Northern Territory
Victoria Daly Region